St. Nersess Armenian Seminary is a seminary under the auspices of the Armenian Church of America, which is the American branch of the Armenian Apostolic Church. Since 2015, it has been located in Armonk, New York. It is the only Armenian theological seminary in the Western hemisphere. It was an idea of Archbishop Tiran Nersoyan, who served as the first dean. He felt that the then 19 priests in the Armenian Church in America could hardly support the more than 30 parishes and first proposed a seminary in America in 1947. The seminary is named after St. Nerses IV the Gracious, Catholicos of All Armenians from 1166 to 1173.

It was founded in 1961 in Evanston, Illinois and was the first Armenian seminary in the United States where it was originally affiliated with Seabury-Western Theological Seminary in suburban Chicago. in 1967, the seminary moved to New York, to bring the seminary closer to the geographical center of the diocese and to forge stronger ties with other churches of the East. Starting during this period the seminary became affiliated with St. Vladimir's Orthodox Theological Seminary with whom it has maintained a close relationship, including a joint visit to his Holiness Karekin II, Catholicos of All Armenians. In 1978, the seminary purchased their own building in New Rochelle. 

To celebrate the 40th anniversary of the seminary, a symposium on Armenian and Christian near East worship traditions was held, later collected in book form.

In 2012, a new campus was planned and built for the seminary in Armonk, New York which would open in 2015 and was formally dedicated the following year.

The seminary offers two graduate degrees, a Master of Divinity in conjunction with St. Vladimir's and a Master of Arts in Armenian Christian Studies. It also regularly offers exchange programs with the Armenian Patriarchate of Jerusalem’s Sts. Tarkmanchatz School.

The seminary has published the St. Nersess Theological Review an Armenological publication since 1996.

References 

Armenian-American culture in New York (state)
Armenian diaspora communities in the United States
Armenian seminaries